David Deutsch (born May 13, 1945 in Brooklyn, New York) is a retired professional basketball player who spent one season in the National Basketball Association (NBA) with the New York Knicks during the 1966–67 season. The Knicks drafted him during the 1966 NBA Draft in the 12 round (98 overall) from the University of Rochester.

External links
 

1945 births
Living people
Basketball players from New York City
New York Knicks draft picks
New York Knicks players
Rochester Yellowjackets men's basketball players
Seattle SuperSonics expansion draft picks
Sportspeople from Brooklyn
American men's basketball players
Guards (basketball)